Charles Alexander Kazimieras Salatka (February 26, 1918 – March 17, 2003) was a prelate of the Roman Catholic Church. He served as archbishop of the Archdiocese of Oklahoma City in Oklahoma from 1977 to 1992.  Salatka was the first bishop of Lithuanian descent in the United States.

Salaka previously served as the ninth bishop of the Diocese of Marquette in Michigan from 1968 to 1977 and as an auxiliary bishop of the Diocese of Grand Falls in Michigan from 1962 to 1968.

Biography

Early life 
Charles Salatka was born on February 26, 1918, in Grand Rapids, Michigan, the son of Charles Anthony and Mary (Balun) Salatka. Anthony was a sander at a local factory.  At age 14, Salatka started attending St. Joseph's Seminary in Grand Rapids.  After finishing there, he traveled to Washington D.C. to enter the Catholic University of America.

Priesthood 
Salatka was ordained a priest by Bishop Francis Haas for the Diocese of Grand Rapids on February 24, 1945. After his ordination, Salatka was sent to Rome to study, earning two advanced degrees. He became the first pastor of St. Michael's Parish in  Grand Rapids in 1950.  In 1959, he was given the title of monsignor.

Auxiliary Bishop of Grand Rapids 
On December 9, 1961, Pope John XXIII appointed Salatka as an auxiliary bishop of the Diocese of Grand Rapids and titular bishop of Cariana. He was consecrated in Grand Rapids by Cardinal Egidio Vagnozzi  on March 6, 1962.  Salatka was the first American bishop of Lithuanian descent.

Bishop of Marquette 
On January 10, 1968, Pope Paul VI appointed Salatka as bishop of the Diocese of  Marquette .  He was installed on March 25, 1968.  Facing a large financial deficit, Salaka was forced to closed two thirds of the schools in the diocese.

In September 1972, Salatka established a tribunal as a start of the canonization process for Frederic Baraga, an early bishop of what was then the Diocese of Sault Sainte Marie and Marquette in Michigan.

Archdiocese of Oklahoma City 
Pope Paul VI appointed Salatka as archbishop of the Archdiocese of Oklahoma City on October 11, 1977. He was installed on December 15, 1977.  He founded the Office of Hispanic Ministry in the 1970s and learned to speak Spanish at age 68 so that he could celebrate mass in that language.

On October 3, 1981, Salatka celebrated a funeral mass in Oklahoma City for Stanley Rother, a priest from the diocese.  Rother was murdered by three assassins, considered to be working for a right wing group, on July 28, 1981, while on a mission in Guatemala.  Salatka had recalled Rother to Oklahoma in January 1981 due to threats on his life.  However, Rother persuaded him to allow his return to Guatemala. On September 23, 2017, Rother was beatified.

Retirement and legacy 
Pope John Paul II accepted Salatka's resignation as Archbishop of Oklahoma City  on November 24, 1992. Charles Salatka died in Oklahoma City on March 17, 2003.

In May 2003, the Archdiocese of Oklahoma settled a sexual abuse lawsuit that was filed in 1999.  The plaintiff Casey Johnson claimed that he was sexually molested three times as a minor during the 1990s by James Rapp, a priest at Assumption Parish in Duncan, Oklahoma.  Rapp had been accused of sexually abusing children at a Catholic junior high school in Jackson, Michigan in the 1980s.  After over eight months of treatment, Salatka approved his transfer to the Archdiocese of Oklahoma, where he abuse Johnson.  Rapp was convicted of child sexual abuse in 1999 and sentenced to 40 years in state prison.

References 

Roman Catholic archbishops of Oklahoma City
1918 births
2003 deaths
Clergy from Grand Rapids, Michigan
Roman Catholic Diocese of Grand Rapids
Participants in the Second Vatican Council
Roman Catholic bishops of Marquette
20th-century Roman Catholic archbishops in the United States
American people of Polish descent